Moerchia is a genus of sea snails, marine gastropod mollusks in the family Pyramidellidae, the pyrams and their allies.

Species
 Moerchia deformata Rubio & Rolán, 2014
 Moerchia intermedia (Thiele, 1925)
 Moerchia introspecta Hedley, 1907
 Moerchia morleti P. Fischer, 1877
 Moerchia obvoluta A. Adams, 1860
 Moerchia perforata Rubio & Rolán, 2014
Taxon inquirendum 
 Moerchia biplicata P. Fischer, 1877

References

 Thiele, J. (1924). Revision des Systems der Trochacea. Mitteilungen aus dem Zoologischen Museum in Berlin. 11(1): 47-74
 Thiele, J. (1929-1935). Handbuch der systematischen Weichtierkunde. Jena, Gustav Fischer, 1154 pp.
 Rubio F. & Rolán E. (2014). Two new species of Moerchia A. Adams, 1860 (Gastropoda, Pyramidellidae) from southwest tropical Pacific. Novapex. 15(3-4): 63-71

External links
 Adams, A. (1860). On some new genera and species of Mollusca from Japan. Annals and Magazine of Natural History. (3) 5: 299-303 [1 April 1860; 405-413]
 Laseron, C. F. (1958). Liotiidae and allied molluscs from the Dampierian Zoogeographical Province. Records of the Australian Museum. 24: 165-182

Pyramidellidae